Muški košarkaški klub Spartak, commonly referred to as MKK Spartak Subotica or Spartak Office Shoes due to sponsorship reasons, is a men's professional basketball club based in Subotica, Serbia. They are currently competing in the top-tier Basketball League of Serbia.

History 

The club was founded in 1945 and was named after Jovan Mikić Spartak, an Olympic athlete from Subotica, who was killed in 1944.

After finishing at the 7th place in the canceled 2019–20 season of the Second League of Serbia (2nd-tier), the club failed to fulfill the League requirements and got relegated to the 4th-tier Second Regional League for the 2020–21 season.

In August 2021, the Basketball Federation of Serbia confirmed a disaffiliation of Fair Play and their merge into Spartak. The club took the Fair Play's spot for the 2021–22 Second Serbian League season.

Sponsorship naming
The club has had several denominations through the years due to its sponsorship:
 Sinalco Spartak (2003–2007)
 Spartak Office Shoes (2021–present)

Players

Current roster

Coaches 

  Janko Lukovski (1986–1988)
  Goran Miljković (1989–1993)
  Goran Mijović (1993–1994)
  Zoran Kovačević (1994)
  Rajko Toroman (1995–1997)
  Slobodan Lukić (1997)
  Srećko Sekulović (1997–2000)
  Radomir Kisić (2001–2002)
  Jovica Antonić (2002)
  Vojkan Benčić (2005–2006)
  Vuk Stanimirović 
  Blagoja Ivić (2009–2010)
  Mihajlo Mitić (2012–2013)
  Filip Socek (2014–2015)
  Dušan Alimpijević (2015–2017)
  Aleksandar Jončevski (2017)
  Nenad Čanak (2017)
  Dragoljub Vidačić (2017–2018)
  Slobodan Ljubotina (2018–2019)
  Slobodan Bjelica (2019–2020)
  Blagoja Ivić (2020)
  Deni Katanić (2020–2021)
  Filip Socek (2021)
  Srećko Sekulović (2021–2022)
  Oliver Kostić (2022–2023)
  Željko Lukajić (2023–present)

Trophies and awards

Trophies
 Second League of Serbia (2nd-tier)
 Winner (1): 2021–22
League Cup of Serbia (2nd-tier)
Winner (1): 2022–23
Yugoslav Cup (defunct)
 Runners-up (1): 1994–95

Notable players

  Vojkan Benčić
  Nenad Čanak
  Branko Cvetković
  Vladimir Đokić
  Marko Jagodić-Kuridža
  Nikola Kalinić
  Dejan Koturović
  Dragan Lukovski
  Danilo Mijatović
  Oliver Popović
  Petar Popović
  Predrag Šuput
  Kemal Karahodžić
  Gracin Bakumanya

International record

References

External links
 
 KK Spartak Subotica at srbijasport.net
 KK Spartak Subotica at eurobasket.com

Basketball teams in Serbia
Basketball teams in Yugoslavia
Basketball teams established in 1945
Sport in Subotica
1945 establishments in Serbia